Paula Hawkins may refer to:

 Paula Hawkins (author) (born 1972), British novelist
 Paula Hawkins (politician) (1927–2009), US senator from Florida